Mustafa Abu Musameh is a Jordanian footballer, of Palestinian origin, who plays as a goalkeeper for Al-Sareeh and Jordan U-22.

References

External links 
 

1991 births
Living people
Jordanian footballers
Jordan international footballers
Association football goalkeepers
Al-Hussein SC (Irbid) players
Mansheyat Bani Hasan players
Al-Sareeh SC players
Al-Arabi (Jordan) players
Al-Jalil players
Jordanian Pro League players